Haji Abdul Aziz Abdul Kadir (born 11 February 1963) is a Malaysian politician and a former Member of the Parliament of Malaysia for the Ketereh constituency in Kelantan. He is a member of the People's Justice Party (PKR) in the Pakatan Rakyat opposition coalition.

Abdul Aziz was elected to the Ketereh seat in the 2008 election, defeating United Malay National Organisation (UMNO)'s Annuar Musa by 400 votes. Annuar re-took the seat in the 2013 election by 972 votes. PKR unsuccessfully challenged the 2013 result in the Malaysian courts.

Election results

References

Living people
1963 births
People from Kelantan
Malaysian people of Malay descent
Malaysian Muslims
Members of the Dewan Rakyat
People's Justice Party (Malaysia) politicians